The Re-election system of the Football League, in use until 1986, was a process by which the worst-placed clubs in the League had to reapply for their place, while non-League clubs could apply for a place. It was the only way for a non-League side to enter the Football League until direct promotion and relegation was introduced from the 1986–87 season onwards. The clubs placed on a re-election rank at the end of a season had to face their Football League peers at the Annual General Meeting of the League. At the AGM the league members had the choice to either vote to retain the current league members, or allow entry to the League for non-League clubs which had applied.

Re-election existed as early as 1890 when Stoke City failed to retain their Football League status. During the first five seasons of the League, that is, until the season 1893–94, re-election process involved the clubs which finished in the bottom four of the League. From the 1894–95 season and until the 1920–21 season the re-election process was required of the clubs which finished in the bottom three of the league. From the 1921–22 season on, it was used for the two last-placed teams of each of the Third Division North and South. After the formation of the Fourth Division in 1958, it applied to the bottom four clubs of that division.

The club which had to undergo the largest number of re-election campaigns, Hartlepool United, with fourteen between 1924 and 1984, was never voted out of the league but a small number of other clubs were, the last of those being Workington in 1977 and Southport in 1978, who lost their league places to Wimbledon and Wigan Athletic respectively.

History

Third Division North and South
The southern group of the Third Division was established in 1920, with the northern group following the next year. The two regional third tier leagues existed in parallel until 1958 when the national Fourth Division was established.

In that era, Walsall faced the most re-election campaigns - seven. Clubs that lost their league place during that time were Aberdare Athletic (1927), Durham City (1928), Ashington (1929), Merthyr Town (1930), Newport County (1931), Nelson (1931), Gillingham (1938) and New Brighton (1951).

The following clubs had to face the re-election process during the Third Division North and South era:

The era of the North and South sections of the Third Division saw many clubs face the first of many threats to their league status which would continue in the days of the Fourth Division from 1958-59 onwards, while at the same time a number of clubs previously more familiar with higher territory were faced with the threat of losing their league status. One of the first examples of this was Bradford City, who had been FA Cup winners in 1911 and First Division members as late as 1922, but finished bottom of the Third Division North in 1949 and had to apply for re-election to the Football League.

Norwich City had to apply for re-election to the Football League four times between 1931 and 1957, but this was soon followed by an upturn in fortunes which included a run to the FA Cup semi-finals in 1959, promotion to the Second Division a year later, Football League Cup glory in 1962, and promotion to the First Division for the first time in 1972. Since then, the club has spent all but one of its seasons in the league's highest two divisions, winning a further League Cup in 1985, winning promotion to the top flight of English football a further six times and finishing in the top five of the English league three times, as well as competing in the UEFA Cup once. By 2016, Norwich had spent a total 22 seasons in the top flight.

Crystal Palace were another club who faced the threat of losing their league status during this era, only to retain their membership and go on to survive and prosper in the Football League. After having to apply for re-election three times between 1949 and 1956, Palace reached the First Division for the first time in 1969 and survived there for four seasons. Palace reached the First Division again in 1979 and survived for two seasons on this occasion. A third promotion to the top flight in 1989 was followed by an FA Cup final appearance the following season and a third place finish a year later. 2019-20 will be Palace's 21st season overall in the top flight of English football.

Fourth Division

The Fourth Division was established in 1958 out of the bottom clubs of the two groups of the Third Division. The bottom four of the Fourth Division had to face re-election on an annual basis.

In this era, 32 clubs had to face the re-election process in 28 seasons. Of those, five failed to gain re-election: Gateshead (1960), Bradford (Park Avenue) (1970), Barrow (1972), Workington (1977) and Southport (1978). Elected in their stead were Peterborough United, Cambridge United, Hereford United, Wimbledon and Wigan Athletic. Geographically, all newly elected clubs were located further south than the club they replaced, a shift away from the more remote parts of northern England to the south.

Of those, Gateshead was the first to lose its league place, after only two seasons in the Fourth Division. The club had joined the Football League in 1930 and faced a successful re-election campaign in 1937. The club was convinced it would be re-elected, especially with Southport making their third consecutive re-election bid. In the end, on 28 May 1960, Gateshead only achieved 18 votes, with Southport the next lowest at 29. Gateshead lost their league place to Peterborough United who made their 21st attempt at entry into the Football League.

Gateshead was followed ten years later by former First Division side Bradford Park Avenue. The club had been a league member since 1908 and had faced re-election five times before, being successful in 1956, 1958, 1967, 1968 and 1969. Faced with the process for the fourth year running in 1970, the club received only 17 votes and dropped out of the league while Cambridge United was voted in with 31. Unsuccessful, Wigan Athletic even achieved a higher vote then Bradford Park Avenue, reaching 18.

Two seasons later, Barrow was replaced by Hereford United(they would not regain their Football League place until 2020, 48 years later).

A five-year break followed before Workington was voted out of the league in 1977. The club had only joined the league in 1951, being voted in at the expense of New Brighton which they beat by ten votes. Workington faced two successful re-election campaigns in its first two seasons in the league but then did not have to apply again from 1953 to 1974. After three more successful campaigns in 1974, 1975 and 1976 the club's league membership came to an end on 17 June 1977 when Wimbledon received 27 votes and Workington only 21, finishing fifth in the tally.

The last club to lose their Football League status through a vote was Southport, who were voted out in favour of Wigan Athletic in 1978. Southport was tied with Wigan on 26 votes and a second round between the two was necessary which Wigan carried by nine votes.

No club was voted out in the following eight seasons until 1986, after which the system was abandoned in favour of direct promotion between the Football League and the Football Conference. On 23 May 1986, the last time a re-election vote was held, Exeter City, Cambridge United, Preston North End and Torquay United had their league places confirmed while Enfield was denied a place in the league.

The following clubs had to face the re-election process during the Fourth Division era:

 While not voted out, in 1962 Accrington Stanley resigned from the league and in its place Oxford United was elected. In 1968 Port Vale was forced to face the re-election process after having been expelled that season.

Between 1958 and 1986, many of the teams faced with re-election to the Football League after finishing in the bottom four of the Fourth Division were among those who had faced this threat while members of the regionalised Third Division. However, several clubs more familiar with the higher reaches of English football were also faced with the re-election process.

Bradford Park Avenue, who had played in the First Division during the 1914-15 season and for two seasons after the resumption of league football following World War I, were voted out of the Football League in 1970 and replaced by Cambridge United.

Oldham Athletic, who spent nine seasons in the First Division leading up to 1923 and had been league runners-up in 1915, had to apply for re-election at the end of the first two campaigns of the new Fourth Division.

Two even more recently successful clubs were faced with having to apply for re-election during the final years of the system. Blackpool, FA Cup winners in 1953 and First Division members as recently as 1971, had to apply for re-election in 1983, as did Preston North End, who had won the first two Football League titles in 1889 and 1890, as well as winning the FA Cup as late as 1938 and playing in the First Division as late as 1961.

Hartlepool United had to apply for re-election 11 times in 28 seasons after finishing in the bottom four of the Fourth Division, but were successful every time.

References

Sources
 Backpass magazine 2013-14 (Ghosts of the League series), Hyder Jawad
 Rothmans Football Yearbook 1986–87, Editor: Peter Dunk, published: 1986
 Rothmans Football Yearbook 2002–2003, Editors: Glenda & Jack Rollin, published: 2002
 Rejected F.C., Volume 1, Dave Twydell, published: 1992

External links
The Football League official website
RSSSF Football League archive, 1888–

Defunct English Football League competitions
English Football League
1986 disestablishments in England
Elections by type